USS Carolina, a schooner, was the only ship of the United States Navy to be named for the British colony that became the states of North Carolina and South Carolina.  Her keel was laid down at Charleston, South Carolina. She was purchased by the Navy while still on the stocks, launched on 10 November 1812, and commissioned on 4 June 1813 with Lieutenant J. D. Henley in command.

Carolina set sail for New Orleans, Louisiana, and while making her passage, captured the British schooner Shark. Arriving at New Orleans 23 August 1814, she began an active career of patrol directed against possible British action as well as the pirates that infested the Caribbean Sea. On 16 September 1814, Carolina attacked and destroyed the stronghold of the notorious Jean Lafitte on the island of Barataria.

Carolina, with the others of the small naval force in the area, carried out the series of operations which gave General Andrew Jackson time to prepare the defense of New Orleans when the British threatened the city in December 1814. On 23 December, she dropped down the river to the British bivouac which she bombarded with so telling an effect as to make a material contribution to the eventual victory. As the British stiffened their efforts to destroy the naval force and to take the city, Carolina came under heavy fire from enemy artillery on 27 December. The heated shot set her afire, and her crew was forced to abandon her. Shortly after, she exploded.

References 

Schooners of the United States Navy
War of 1812 ships of the United States
Ships built in Charleston, South Carolina
1812 ships
Piracy in the Caribbean
Ships involved in anti-piracy efforts
Shipwrecks of the Louisiana coast
Maritime incidents in 1814
Anti-piracy battles involving the United States